The Saint Andrew's Society of the State of New York, founded in 1756, is a charitable organization focused on helping Scots in the New York community.

History
The Society is led by a President, First Vice President, Second Vice President and Managers.

List of presidents

References
Notes

Sources

External links
 History of Saint Andrew's Society of the State of New York, 1756-1906, by George Austin Morrison.
 Scots and Scots Descendant in America by D. MacDougall, 1917.
 

Organizations based in New York City
Organizations established in 1756
Lineage societies
Scottish-American history
Ethnic fraternal orders in the United States
Presidents of the Saint Andrew's Society of the State of New York